The Luxgen U7, previously known as the Luxgen7 SUV, is a 7-seater mid-size SUV introduced by the Taiwanese manufacturer Luxgen which has won two Taiwan Excellence Awards.

History
The vehicle was developed under Yulon's R&D center, HITEC. The Luxgen is currently sold in Vietnam, China, Taiwan, UAE, Saudi Arabia, Bahrain, Kuwait, Oman , and Iran. It is available as either a front-wheel drive or four-wheel drive and is powered by a turbocharged-and-intercooled 2.2-liter DOHC 4-cylinder engine, mated to either a 5-speed manual or a 5-speed automatic transmission.

Design
Features include the Luxgen Think+ system, co-developed with smartphone makers HTC, that comes with built-in HSPDA 3.5G communications, GPS Navigation, and a 10.2-inch LCD screen. The system also includes the "Eagle View+" 360-degree parking assist, which utilizes four cameras to provide a real-time visual display of the surrounding environment. The "Side View+" feature automatically displays live video images of the vehicle's rear blind spots to reduce the chance of an accident during lane changes. The "Night Vision+" high-sensitivity night vision camera system helps illuminate the road and traffic conditions at night beyond the range of the headlamps. "LDWS+" constantly reads the road surface for lane markers and dividers and gives audible and visual warnings when the vehicle veers too close to the lane markings. The SUV is equipped with 23 advanced ECUs and 8 video cameras to provide these features. Also available are power-opening doors, leather upholstery, a rear DVD screen, Bluetooth, and more.

Gallery

References

External links

 Luxgen UAE | Western Auto LLC
 | Luxgen UAE on Facebook
Luxgen Official Site - Official Website (English)
Luxgen Motors - Official Website (Taiwanese)

U7
Front-wheel-drive vehicles
All-wheel-drive vehicles
Cars introduced in 2010
Mid-size sport utility vehicles
 Crossover sport utility vehicles